Ericson is a village in Wheeler County, Nebraska, United States. The population was 92 at the 2010 census.

History
Ericson was platted in 1886 by the C.B.& Q. railroad when the railroad's line to Greeley was extended to that location. It was named for Christensen Erickson, the original owner of the town site.  The town grew slowly, and the first depot agent, named Dahl,
also bought grain, sold coal, and took over the store being run by Peter Erickson, to keep the town viable.

Geography
Ericson is located at  (41.780545, -98.677970).

Demographics

2010 census
As of the census of 2010, there were 92 people, 51 households, and 29 families residing in the village. The racial makeup of the village was 100.0% White.

There were 51 households, of which 13.7% had children under the age of 18 living with them, 54.9% were married couples living together, 2.0% had a male householder with no wife present, and 43.1% were non-families. 39.2% of all households were made up of individuals, and 27.4% had someone living alone who was 65 years of age or older. The average household size was 1.80 and the average family size was 2.34.

The median age in the village was 62 years. 12% of residents were under the age of 18; 0.0% were between the ages of 18 and 24; 12% were from 25 to 44; 33.7% were from 45 to 64; and 42.4% were 65 years of age or older. The gender makeup of the village was 50.0% male and 50.0% female.

2000 census
As of the census of 2000, there were 104 people, 57 households, and 29 families residing in the village. The population density was 279.5 people per square mile (108.5/km2). There were 69 housing units at an average density of 185.4 per square mile (72.0/km2). The racial makeup of the village was 100.00% White.

There were 57 households, out of which 19.3% had children under the age of 18 living with them, 43.9% were married couples living together, 5.3% had a female householder with no husband present, and 49.1% were non-families. 49.1% of all households were made up of individuals, and 28.1% had someone living alone who was 65 years of age or older. The average household size was 1.82 and the average family size was 2.55.

In the village, the population was spread out, with 19.2% under the age of 18, 1.0% from 18 to 24, 17.3% from 25 to 44, 36.5% from 45 to 64, and 26.0% who were 65 years of age or older. The median age was 54 years. For every 100 females, there were 89.1 males. For every 100 females age 18 and over, there were 78.7 males.

As of 2000 the median income for a household in the village was $25,278, and the median income for a family was $35,500. Males had a median income of $19,583 versus $21,250 for females. The per capita income for the village was $15,506. There were no families and 11.4% of the population living below the poverty line, including no under eighteens and 28.1% of those over 64.

References

Villages in Nebraska
Villages in Wheeler County, Nebraska